Saylesville (also Sayesville or South Genesee) is an unincorporated community located in the town of Genesee, Waukesha County, Wisconsin, United States. Saylesville is home to the J. C. Booth House and the William Johnston Lime Kiln, both of which are listed on the National Register of Historic Places.

References

External links

Unincorporated communities in Waukesha County, Wisconsin
Unincorporated communities in Wisconsin